Ermelo may also refer to:
 Ermelo, Mpumalanga, town in South Africa
Ermelo, Netherlands, a municipality and a town in the Netherlands, in the province of Gelderland.
 , parish in Arcos de Valdevez Municipality, Portugal
 , parish in Mondim de Basto Municipality, Portugal